Harvey Smith may refer to: 
Harvey Smith (baseball) (1871–1962), baseball player
Harvey C. Smith (1874–1929), Republican politician in the U.S. state of Ohio
Harvey Smith (Canadian politician) (1936–2017), politician in Winnipeg, Manitoba, Canada
Harvey Smith (equestrian) (born 1938), British equestrian
Harvey Smith (American politician) (born 1945), American politician in the state of Vermont
L. Harvey Smith (born 1948), New Jersey state senator
Harvey Smith (game designer) (born 1966), American game designer

See also
 Harvey Smyth, senior Royal Air Force officer